Roman II may refer to:

 Roman the Great of Kiev (after 1160–1205)
 Roman II Igorevich (1177/1179 – 1211)
 Roman II of Moldavia (co-ruler of Moldova in 1447–1448)
 Roman II of Leibnitz (bishop of Gurk in 1174-1179)

See also
 Romanos II (938-963), Byzantine Emperor